Sant Pau  Dos de Maig is a station on L5 of the Barcelona Metro.

Named for the Hospital de Sant Pau World Heritage Site which it serves, the station is located underneath Carrer de la Indústria in the Eixample, between Carrer Cartagena and Carrer Dos de Maig. It was opened in 1970. Its previous name, before 2009, was Hospital de Sant Pau.

The separate-platform station has a ticket hall on either end, each with one access, on Carrer Cartagena and Carrer Dos de Maig/Indústria.

Services

See also
Hospital de Sant Pau
Guinardó-Hospital de Sant Pau

External links

 Hospital de Sant Pau at Trenscat.com

Railway stations in Spain opened in 1970
Transport in Eixample
Barcelona Metro line 5 stations